Katrina Mary Fong Lim  (born 2 September 1961) is the former Lord Mayor of the city of Darwin, Northern Territory, Australia.

Biography

Fong Lim completed a  Bachelor of Business and Master of Professional Accounting at the University of Southern Queensland.

References

1961 births
Living people
Mayors and Lord Mayors of Darwin
Australian politicians of Chinese descent
Women mayors of places in the Northern Territory
University of Southern Queensland alumni
Members of the Order of Australia